Max Gunter Lagally (born 23 May 1942, Darmstadt, Germany) is Erwin W. Mueller Professor and Bascom Professor of Surface Science at the University of Wisconsin–Madison.

Education
He received his BS (physics) 1963, Pennsylvania State University, his MS (physics) 1965, University of Wisconsin–Madison, and his Ph.D. (physics) 1968, University of Wisconsin–Madison.

Awards and honors
His works were cited more than 11,000 times.
Elected to the National Academy of Engineering in 2001.
Elected to Fellowship in the American Association for the Advancement of Science (AAAS) in 1999.
Elected a member of the Deutsche Akademie der Naturforscher - Leopoldina (the German National Academy of Science) in 1999.
Outstanding Science Alumnus Award, Pennsylvania State University, 1996.
Davisson-Germer Prize in Atomic or Surface Physics, American Physical Society, 1995.
Welch Award, AVS, 1991.

References

External links
 Home page at the University of Wisconsin–Madison

21st-century American physicists
1942 births
Living people
Eberly College of Science alumni
University of Wisconsin–Madison College of Letters and Science alumni
Members of the United States National Academy of Engineering
Fellows of the American Physical Society